Grace Petrie (born 24 July 1987) is an English folk singer-songwriter and guitarist from Leicester, England. She was hailed in The Guardian as "a powerful new songwriting voice" in 2011.

Biography
Grace Petrie began performing in 2006 as a solo vocalist and acoustic guitarist, and self-released an eponymous album that year, followed in 2007 by second album Feeling Better. In 2010, the advent of the Conservative-led coalition government following the (UK) general election influenced Petrie, who is a socialist, feminist, and lesbian, towards an increasing emphasis on politically focused songwriting, from a left-wing perspective. She made her debut appearance on Glastonbury's Leftfield stage at the invitation of Billy Bragg in summer 2010, and widely praised third album Tell Me A Story followed, including signature song "Farewell to Welfare".

In 2011, Petrie toured with comedian Josie Long. Fourth album Mark My Words followed, including the song "Emily Davison Blues" – a comment on media reaction to the 2011 riots. A special film directed by Chris Shepherd for the song "Rise" from the same album was screened on Channel 4 as part of the TV series Random Acts. In 2012, Petrie took part in the "Anti-Capitalist Roadshow" alongside Roy Bailey, Robb Johnson, Leon Rosselson, Peggy Seeger and others. She has also performed gigs with other political folk artists such as Chris T-T, David Rovics and Dick Gaughan, as well as political indie/punk rock bands like Thee Faction and Colour Me Wednesday.

In 2013, Petrie released her fifth album Love is My Rebellion with new backing band The Benefits Culture, consisting of Jess Greengrass (percussion) and Caitlin Field (bass).

Petrie has made an annual appearance at Glastonbury since 2010 as well as regularly playing festivals such as Towersey, Greenbelt Festival, Latitude and others. She has toured nationally with Emmy the Great, Billy Bragg and comedian Robin Ince, and has made several appearances on BBC Radio 4's The Now Show. In 2014, a live concert recorded at St. Pancras Old Church was released on CD and DVD.

In 2015, she released the album Whatever's Left.

In 2016, Petrie along with numerous other celebrities, toured the UK to support Jeremy Corbyn's bid to become Prime Minister.

Discography

Albums
Grace Petrie (2006)
Feel Better (2007)
Tell Me A Story (2010)
Mark My Words (2011)
Love is My Rebellion (2013)
Live at St. Pancras Old Church (2014)
Whatever's Left (2015)
Heart First Aid Kit (2017)
Queer as Folk (2018)
Connectivity (2021) - UK Albums Chart number 37

EPs
There's No Such Thing as a Protest Singer (2016)

References

External links

Official website
Bandcamp
Nov 2011 interview
Dec 2013 interview
Jan 2014 interview

1987 births
Living people
English women singer-songwriters
English folk musicians
English socialists
Political music artists
English LGBT singers
English LGBT songwriters
Feminist musicians
English sceptics
21st-century English women singers
21st-century English singers
British lesbian musicians
20th-century LGBT people
21st-century LGBT people
Lesbian singers
Lesbian songwriters